Nahas is a surname which is also used as a given name. People with the surname include:

Surname
 Abu Jaʿfar an-Nahhas (died 949), Egyptian Muslim scholar 
 Charbel Nahas (born 1954), Lebanese economist and politician
 Fadi Nahas (born 1957), Lebanese businessman 
 Gabriel G. Nahas (1920–2012), American anesthesiologist 
 Mostafa El-Nahas (1879–1965), Egyptian politician
 Nabil Nahas (born 1949), Lebanese artist
 Nicolas Nahas (born 1946), Lebanese politician
 Robin Nahas (born 1987), Australian rules footballer
 Sayed El-Nahas (1939–1994), Egyptian boxer
 Shady El Nahas (born 1998), Canadian judoka
 Sean Nahas, American soccer coach

Given name
Nahas Angula (born 1943), Namibian politician 

Arabic-language surnames